Daēnā is a Zoroastrian concept representing insight and revelation, hence "conscience" or "religion." Alternately, Daena is considered to be a divinity, counted among the yazatas.

Nomenclature
Daena is a feminine noun which translates to "that which is seen or observed". In Zoroastrianism: An Introduction to an Ancient Faith, Peter Clark suggests that the term might also be tied to the Avestan root "deh" or "di-" to gain understanding.

The Avestan term  – trisyllabic  in Gathic Avestan and bisyllabic  in Younger Avestan – continues into Middle Persian as dēn (origin of New Persian دین), which preserves the Avestan meanings. For comparison, it has a Sanskrit cognate dhénā which means thought, but thought in its higher and spiritual reaches. The word Zen, as used in the name of the religious sect of Zen Buddhism, is derived from the cognate dhayanā (see also Dhyāna in Buddhism).

It is thought that the Daena of Zoroastrianism is related to Sanskrit Dharma, also meaning "the Law".

In Scripture

The concept of Daena is mentioned in the Gathas, a series of seventeen hymns supposedly written by Zoroaster. Daena appears both in the Ahunavaiti Gatha and in the Ushtavaiti Gatha, where it is written that Daena is somehow affiliated with the reward that the faithful will receive in the afterlife. However, references to Daena in the Gathas are brief, leaving much ambiguity on its nature.

Later Avestan writings, such as the Vendidad, describe the concept of Daena further. The Vendidad portrays Daena as something of a psychopomp, guiding good and pure souls over the Chinvat Bridge to the House of Song, Zoroastrian paradise, while the wicked are dragged to the House of Lies, a place of punishment. She is described as being finely dressed and accompanied by dogs.

Maneckji Nusserwanji Dhalla writes in Zoroastrian Theology that on the dawn of the fourth day after death, "there appears then to the soul its own daena, or religious conscience in the shape of a damsel of unsurpassed beauty, the fairest of the fair in the world."

Daena is the eternal Law, whose order was revealed to humanity through the Mathra Spenta "Holy Words". Daena has been used to mean religion, faith, law, even as a translation for the Hindu and Buddhist term Dharma, often interpreted as "duty" or social order, right conduct, or virtue. The metaphor of the 'path' of Daena is represented in Zoroastrianism by the muslin sedreh undershirt, the "Good/Holy Path", and the 72-thread Kushti girdle, the "Pathfinder".

See also
Dharma
Din (Arabic)
Dhyāna (disambiguation)
Maid of Heaven

References 

Yazatas
Ancient Iranian goddesses
Psychopomps